The following highways are numbered 307:

Brazil
 BR-307

Canada
 Manitoba Provincial Road 307
 Nova Scotia Route 307
 Prince Edward Island Route 307
 Quebec Route 307
 Saskatchewan Highway 307

China
 China National Highway 307

Costa Rica
 National Route 307

India
 National Highway 307 (India)

Japan
 Japan National Route 307

Mexico
 Mexican Federal Highway 307
 Mexican Federal Highway 307D

Philippines
 N307 highway (Philippines)

United Kingdom
 road

United States
 Florida:
  County Road 307 (Gilchrist County, Florida)
  County Road 307 (Gilchrist County, Florida)
  Georgia State Route 307
  Kentucky Route 307
  Louisiana Highway 307
  Maryland Route 307
  Montana Secondary Highway 307 (former)
 New York:
  New York State Route 307 (former)
 County Route 307 (Albany County, New York)
  County Route 307 (Erie County, New York)
  North Carolina Highway 307
  Ohio State Route 307
  Pennsylvania Route 307
  Puerto Rico Highway 307
  Tennessee State Route 307
 Texas:
  Texas State Highway 307 (former)
  Texas State Highway Loop 307
  Farm to Market Road 307
  Utah State Route 307 (former)
  Virginia State Route 307
  Washington State Route 307
  West Virginia Route 307